The 2018–19 Bayer 04 Leverkusen season was the 115th season in the football club's history and 40th consecutive and overall season in the top flight of German football, the Bundesliga, having been promoted from the 2. Bundesliga Nord in 1979. In addition to the domestic league, Bayer Leverkusen also participated in this season's editions of the domestic cup, the DFB-Pokal, and the second-tier continental cup, the UEFA Europa League. This was the 61st season for Leverkusen in the BayArena, located in Leverkusen, North Rhine-Westphalia, Germany. The season covers a period from 1 July 2018 to 30 June 2019.

The season was the first since 2005-06 without Stefan Kießling, who retired after the 2017-18 season.

Players

Squad information

Players out on loan

Transfers

In

Out

Friendly matches

Competitions

Overview

Bundesliga

League table

Results summary

Results by round

Matches

DFB-Pokal

UEFA Europa League

Group stage

Knockout phase

Round of 32

Statistics

Appearances and goals

|-
! colspan=14 style=background:#dcdcdc; text-align:center| Goalkeepers

|-
! colspan=14 style=background:#dcdcdc; text-align:center| Defenders

|-
! colspan=14 style=background:#dcdcdc; text-align:center| Midfielders

|-
! colspan=14 style=background:#dcdcdc; text-align:center| Forwards

|-
! colspan=14 style=background:#dcdcdc; text-align:center| Players transferred out during the season

References

Bayer 04 Leverkusen seasons
Leverkusen
Bayer Leverkusen